Richard Eugene Stotts (born 27 October 1953) (better known as Richie Stotts) is a musician, who was the first guitarist and one of the founding members of the punk/metal group Plasmatics.

In 1978, Richie was among the earliest musicians to sport a Mohawk,
taking inspiration from the Travis Bickle character in the movie Taxi Driver.  In an effort to keep up with his constantly outrageous stagemate Wendy O. Williams, he would also cross dress in various items like a nurse's uniform, a tutu, a wedding dress and a French maid.

After leaving the Plasmatics in 1984, Richie pursued a solo career with his band King Flux and a graduate degree in Geology.
Richie appears in a brief cameo in 9½ Weeks, movie with Kim Basinger. He's recognizable by the blonde mohawk and chainsaw tattoo in a party scene.

He was a great friend of Joey Ramone and was one of several speakers at a CBGB's all-star tribute put on by Mickey Leigh, Joey's brother, in 2001.  Dee Dee Ramone was also a friend, the two composed "Punishment Fits the Crime" which appeared on the 1989 Brain Drain album by the Ramones.

In 2004, he collaborated with singer-songwriter and wife Carla Lother on several songs for her 100 Lovers album.

Discography
See the Plasmatics and King Flux.

References

External links
Richie Stotts Website
Interview with Richie Stotts
Richie Stotts on 1980's TV Show Fridays

American punk rock guitarists
Plasmatics members
Living people
1953 births